SremmLife 2 (sometimes stylized as SremmLife II) is the second studio album by American hip hop duo Rae Sremmurd. It was released on August 12, 2016, by Ear Drummer Records and Interscope Records. The album serves as a sequel to their previous studio effort, SremmLife (2015). It features guest appearances from Kodak Black, Gucci Mane, Juicy J, Lil Jon and Bobo Swae.

SremmLife 2 was supported by four singles: "By Chance", "Look Alive", "Black Beatles" and "Swang". The album debuted at number seven on the US Billboard 200 and later reached number four. It received generally positive reviews from critics.

Promotion
The album's lead single, "By Chance", was released on February 13, 2016, the song peaked at number 39 on the US Hot R&B/Hip-Hop Songs. The album's second single, "Look Alive", was released on April 14, 2016, the song peaked at number 72 on the US Billboard Hot 100.

"Black Beatles" featuring Gucci Mane, was sent to urban contemporary radio on September 13, 2016, as the album's third single. On September 22, 2016, the music video for "Black Beatles" was released on Rae Sremmurd's Vevo account on YouTube. The song peaked at number one on the Billboard Hot 100.

"Swang" was sent to urban contemporary radio on January 24, 2017, as the album's fourth single, the song peaked at number 26 on the Billboard Hot 100.

Other songs
The album's first promotional single, "Over Here", was released on March 23, 2016, the song was released as an interactive music video powered by Doritos. "Set the Roof" featuring Lil Jon, was released on August 7, 2016, as the album's second promotional single.

Critical reception

SremmLife 2 was met with generally positive reviews. At Metacritic, which assigns a normalized rating out of 100 to reviews from professional publications, the album received an average score of 75, based on 13 reviews. Aggregator AnyDecentMusic? gave it 7.1 out of 10, based on their assessment of the critical consensus.

Exclaim!s Calum Slingerland gave the album a positive review, calling it "a rarely relenting party with more substance than the last". Narsimha Chintaluri of HipHopDX gave the album a positive review stating, "SremmLife 2 is worthwhile (and much needed) bid for album of the summer. It's top heavy, "By Chance", "Look Alive", and "Black Beatles" feeling a lot like one of the best three song stretches of the year, but Swae brings a promising sense of experimentation to the entire project". Sheldon Pearce of Pitchfork wrote: "SremmLife 2 collects all of the quirks in the margins of its predecessor and develops them; more than anything else, SremmLife 2 is the ultimate middle finger to grouches who think this brand of rap can't be complex." Grant Rindner of The Line of Best Fit commented: "There are real signs of musical development on Sremmurd 2 that point to longevity for the duo." David Sackllah of Consequence said, "SremmLife 2 may not pack the punch of its predecessor, but it shows that the brothers are growing musically. Far from one-note, Rae Sremmurd have the chops to sustain a long and varied run going forward". David Jeffries of AllMusic stated that "Hotter singles make their debut a better buy, but for a group pegged as a one-hit wonder early on, SremmLife 2 dispels that myth with style".

In more mixed reviews, XXLs Scott Gleysher stated: "SremmLife 2 is by no means a sophomore slump but just doesn't quite fill the same space as the first installment did last year." Lukas Maeder of Rolling Stone commented: "Stretching beyond SremmLife, their party-starting choruses are squeaked, squawked and shouted; mellower stuff can get a Makonnen-esque broken falsetto ("Swang"); "By Chance" succeeds with a haughty Dana Dane accent."

Year-end lists

Commercial performance
SremmLife 2 debuted at number seven on the US Billboard 200, with 30,000 album-equivalent units with 15,000 pure album sales in its first week. The album later reached a new peak at number four on the chart on the issue dated November 26, 2016, due to the success of "Black Beatles". On November 10, 2017, SremmLife 2 was certified platinum by the Recording Industry Association of America (RIAA) with a million album-equivalent units in the United States.

Track listing

Notes
 signifies a co-producer

Sample credits
 "Shake It Fast" contains interpolations from "Slob on My Knob", performed by Three 6 Mafia.
 "Set the Roof" contains interpolations from the composition "I Don't Believe You Want To Get Up And Dance (Oops)", written by Lonnie Simmons, Charlie Wilson, Robert Wilson, Ronnie Wilson and Rudolph Taylor, and performed by The Gap Band.

Personnel
Credits adapted from the album's liner notes.

Performance
Rae Sremmurd – primary artists
Radric "Gucci Mane" Davis – featured artist (track 5)
Jordan "Juicy J" Houston – featured artist (track 6)
Dieuson "Kodak Black" Octave – featured artist (track 2)
Jonathan "Lil Jon" Smith – featured artist (track 7)

Production

Michael "Mike Will Made It" Williams II – executive producer, producer (tracks 2, 3, 4, 5, 6, 7, 9, 10, 11, 12, 13, 14)
Rae Sremmurd – executive producers
Marc "Scooly" Bell – producer (tracks 9, 11)
Braylin "Resource" Bowman – producer (track 11), co-producer (track 3)
Samuel "30 Roc" Gloade – producer (track 2)
Stephen "The Sauce" Hybicki – producer as part of Crowd+CTRL (track 6)
Asheton "Pluss" Hogan – producer (track 1, 14)
Jordan "The Martianz" Hutchins – producer (track 8)
Dijon "DJ Mustard" McFarlane – producer (track 7)
Adrian Jamal McKinnon – co-producer (track 8)
Marquel "Marz" Middlebrooks – producer (tracks 12, 15, 16)
Rashod "Shoddy" Brown – producer (track 4)
Jiovanni "Louie Ji" Romano – producer (track 4)
Pierre "P-Nazty" Slaughter – producer (tracks 12, 13, 15), co-producer (track 1)
Tariq "BLSSD" Sharrieff – co-producer as part of Crowd+CTRL (track 6)
Bryce "Radio Luv" Smith – co-producer as part of Crowd+CTRL (track 6)
Kenny "Sparxxx Pro" Sparks – co-producer (track 9)
Vaquan "HighDefRazjah" Wilkins – producer (track 10)

Technical

Jasiah "SpydasMix" Antney – mixing (track 8), mixing assistant (tracks 1, 15, 16)
Khalif "Swae Lee" Brown – engineer (tracks 3, 4, 5, 6, 8, 9, 10, 11, 13, 14)
Maddox Chhim – mixing assistant (tracks 4, 6, 7, 9, 10, 14)
Thomas Cullison – engineer (track 7)
Farreed – engineer (track 2)
Michael "Crazy Mike" Foster – engineer (track 6)
Stephen "The Sauce" Hybicki – engineer (track 7), mixing (tracks 3, 4, 5, 9, 10, 11, 12, 14, 15, 16), mixing assistant (track 1)
Jermarcus "Jay Sremm" Jackson – engineer (track 2)
Jaycen Joshua – mixing (tracks 4, 6, 7, 9, 10, 14)
Dave Kutch – mastering (all tracks)
Randy Lanphear – engineer (tracks 2, 3, 4, 5, 6, 8, 9, 10, 11, 13, 14), mixing (track 1), mixing assistant (tracks 3, 12, 15, 16)
Dave Nakaji – mixing assistant (tracks 4, 6, 7, 9, 10, 14)
Sean Payne – engineer (track 5)
Pierre "P-Nazty" Slaughter – engineer (tracks 1, 12, 15, 16)
Scott Taylor Jr. – engineer (track 10)
Finis "KY" White – mixing (tracks 2, 8, 13)

Miscellaneous

Irwan Awalludin – art and design
Juliot Badit – cover and photography
Max "Directed by Max" Hliva – videography
Gunner Stahl – photography
Bryan "Bwrightous" Wright – creative director

Charts

Weekly charts

Year-end charts

Certifications

References

2016 albums
Rae Sremmurd albums
Albums produced by DJ Mustard
Albums produced by Mike Will Made It
Sequel albums
Interscope Records albums